Carew is an unincorporated community in Summers County, West Virginia, United States, located south of Hinton.

References

Unincorporated communities in Summers County, West Virginia
Unincorporated communities in West Virginia